Spider Man is the second album by American jazz vibraphonist Freddie McCoy which was recorded in 1965 for the Prestige label.

Reception

Allmusic rated the album 2 stars.

Track listing
All compositions by Freddie McCoy except where noted.
 "Hav' Mercy" – 3:10   
 "Yesterdays" (Jerome Kern, Otto Harbach) – 7:20   
 "The Girl from Ipanema" (Antônio Carlos Jobim, Vinicius de Moraes, Norman Gimbel) – 4:35   
 "Spider Man" – 3:20   
 "That's All" (Alan Brandt Bob Haymes) – 7:25   
 "Speak Out, Deagan!" – 4:10

Personnel 
Freddie McCoy – vibraphone 
Charles L. Wilson – piano
Steve Davis – bass
Rudy Lawless – drums

References 

1965 albums
Freddie McCoy albums
Prestige Records albums
Albums recorded at Van Gelder Studio
Albums produced by Cal Lampley